Nayef Hawatmeh (Kunya: Abu an-Nuf; born 17 November 1938) is a Jordanian politician who was active in the Palestinian political life.

Hawatmeh hails from a Jordanian clan and is a practicing Greek Catholic.  He is the General Secretary of the Marxist Democratic Front for the Liberation of Palestine (DFLP) since its formation in a 1969 split from the Popular Front for the Liberation of Palestine (PFLP), of which he was also a founder. He was active as a leader in the Arab Nationalist Movement (ANM), which preceded the PFLP.

He presently resides in exile in Syria, from which the DFLP receives some support. 

Hawatmeh opposed the 1993 Oslo Accords, calling them a "sell-out", but became more conciliatory in the late 1990s. In 1999 he agreed to meet with Yassir Arafat (who had signed the accords) and even shook hands with the Israeli President, Ezer Weizmann, at the funeral of King Hussein of Jordan, drawing strong criticism from his Palestinian and Arab peers.

In 2004 he was briefly active in a joint Palestinian-Israeli non-governmental attempt to start a coalition of Palestinian groups supporting a two-state solution, and called for a cessation of hostilities in the al-Aqsa Intifada.

In 2007 Israel indicated it would allow him to travel to the West Bank for the first time since 1967, in order to participate in a meeting of the Palestine Liberation Organization (PLO).

See also 
 Jordanian Christians

Notes

References 

 
 
 
 

Living people
Democratic Front for the Liberation of Palestine politicians
Jordanian communists
Jordanian Christian socialists
Maoists
Jordanian Melkite Greek Catholics
Jordanian Arab nationalists
Popular Front for the Liberation of Palestine members
1938 births